The sixth season of Laverne & Shirley, an American television sitcom series, began airing on November 18, 1980 on ABC. The season concluded on May 26, 1981 after 22 episodes.

The season aired Tuesdays at 8:30-9:00 pm (EST). It ranked 20th among television programs and garnered a 20.6 rating. The entire season was released on DVD in North America on May 21, 2013.

Overview
Laverne and Shirley and their friends all move from Milwaukee to Burbank, California. The ladies take jobs as gift wrappers at a department store; Frank and Edna manage a Texas BBQ restaurant called Cowboy Bill's, Carmine delivers singing telegrams and seeks work as an actor, and Lenny and Squiggy start a talent agency called Squignowski Talent Agency. From this point until the end of the series' run, Laverne & Shirley was set in the mid-1960s, starting in 1965.

Cast

Starring
Penny Marshall as Laverne DeFazio
Cindy Williams as Shirley Feeney
Michael McKean as Leonard "Lenny" Kosnowski
David Lander as Andrew "Squiggy" Squiggman
Phil Foster as Frank DeFazio
Eddie Mekka as Carmine Ragusa
Betty Garrett as Edna Babish
Leslie Easterbrook as Rhonda Lee
Ed Marinaro as Sonny St. Jacques

Guest Starring
Troy Donahue as Himself
Jim Lange as Himself
Vicki Lawrence as Sergeant Alvinia T. Plout

Episodes

References

Laverne & Shirley seasons
1980 American television seasons
1981 American television seasons